Digital television transition in India began in 2010.

History

Digital satellite and cable TV 
Television Networks (Regulation) Amendment Act, 2011 has made digital satellite and cable television transition mandatory in four phases. It was implemented after multiple extension of analogue switch-off dates. The broadcasters, Multi System Operators (MSOs), Local Cable Operators (LCOs) were ordered by the Ministry of Information and Broadcasting to end analogue transmission completely on 31 March 2017.

Digital terrestrial TV 
Telecom Regulatory Authority of India has set the deadlines for the completion of transition to Digital terrestrial TV Phase I (Metro cities) by 31 December 2019, Phase II (cities having a population of more than one million) by 31 December 2021, and Phase III (the rest of India) by 31 December 2023.

See also
 Digital television transition

References

India
Science and technology in India
Television in India